WLRN-FM is a class C1 FM station on 91.3 MHz, and is the main public radio station for South Florida and the Keys based in Miami. The station is owned by the Miami-Dade County Public Schools and is the area's flagship NPR member station, therefore carries Morning Edition, All Things Considered, Weekend Edition, and Wait Wait...Don't Tell Me!. It is also affiliated with Public Radio International and carries The Takeaway  and The World, among others. It airs its own locally-produced music programs Evenin' Jazz with Tracy Fields on weeknights, and Night Train on Sundays, before being taken over by the BBC World Service during the overnights.

WLRN first signed on in 1948 as WTHS-FM, on 91.7 MHz. The station later moved to 91.3, changing the calls to WLRN-FM. It was a charter member of NPR in 1970 and is the longest running NPR member in Florida.

Its HD2 service was WLRN Xtra HD, "South Florida’s Alternative News and Talk Station", featuring talk programming by day and BBC World Service at night. Until December 2, 2007, HD2 carried "Classical 24", which offered classical music 24 hours per day. Classical 24 has since moved to another public radio station, WKCP 89.7 FM, after that station's acquisition by Classical 24's parent, American Public Media, but 89.7 was sold to K-LOVE on July 17. Classical music has returned to WLRN's HD2 as of August 10, 2015 under the Classical 24 service once again but is now referred to as WLRN Classical HD2. Employees are part of AFSCME union local 1187 contract.

The station also maintains its long-time radio reading service for the blind on an analog subcarrier.

The school board also owns WLRN-TV, the secondary PBS member for South Florida on Channel 17.

Translators and repeaters
As of 2022, WLRN-FM has three repeaters in the Florida Keys: 93.3 W227AD in Key Colony Beach, 89.1 W206AS in Big Pine Key, and 100.5 W263BO in Key West. 

In late September 2008, WLRN launched a full-powered, class C3, 12 kW station, WKWM 91.5, in Marathon, Florida, which simulcasts WLRN programming for the southern Keys. This station broadcasts in HD Radio. WKWM has one repeater, 92.1 W221AY in Tavernier.

Beginning February 2021, WLRN broadcast on the HD2 subchannel of Hobe Sound station WOLL, whose signal extends from Stuart to Boca Raton.

101.9, NPR For The Palm Beaches
WLRN-FM also programs W270AD 101.9 in West Palm Beach, Florida, a translator owned by Educational Media Foundation (EMF) and programmed separately as 101.9, NPR For The Palm Beaches; this signal is also simulcast on the HD2 digital signal of EMF's K-Love outlet, WFLV 90.7 FM.

On October 16, 2015, it was announced that WLRN-FM would lease the HD2 of WFLV and the translator W270AD from EMF, relaunching Classical South Florida's NPR service for the region, "WPBI News", as "101.9, NPR For The Palm Beaches" in November 2015. This followed EMF's purchase of WFLV from Classical South Florida who, along with its other outlets WDLV, WMLV and W214BD, was sold to EMF and became affiliates of its K-Love contemporary Christian network. W270AD was programmed as a low-powered and HD2 digital NPR affiliate for the Palm Beaches since Classical South Florida's purchase of then-NPR affiliate WXEL-FM in 2011.

Although W270AD's programming is produced by WLRN-FM, it airs a somewhat separate schedule from WLRN-FM's main signal. An example includes that it doesn't air Radyo Lekol (Creole-language program produced by MDCPS; weeknights from 9:00-9:30pm) or Evenin' Jazz with Tracy Fields (weeknights from 9:30pm–1:00am); BBC World Service airs instead.

Controversy
In June 2011, WLRN dropped ties with the Florida Public Radio Network, a statewide network of public radio stations designed to provide coverage of the Florida Legislature and other Florida-relevant issues, partly in response to its producer, WFSU-FM in Tallahassee, receiving $2.8 million in funding for various services related to Florida government, including $497,522 for "statewide government and cultural affairs programming", which includes the Florida Public Radio Network. This is despite the $4.8 million of funding to other public radio and television stations (including WLRN radio and television) vetoed by Governor Rick Scott in May 2011. In its place, WLRN will join the joint partnership between the Tampa Bay Times and The Miami Herald in coverage of state issues from the papers' Tallahassee bureau.

References

External links
WLRN radio

Night Train
Ted Grossman

 
 

NPR member stations
Radio reading services of the United States
LRN-FM
Miami-Dade County Public Schools
1948 establishments in Florida
Radio stations established in 1948